Ventosa  is a  parish of the municipality of Alenquer, in western Portugal. The population in 2011 was 2,173, in an area of 22.21 km².

References

Parishes of Alenquer, Portugal